TER Grand Est or TER Fluo is the regional rail network serving the region of Grand Est, northeastern France. It is operated by the French national railway company SNCF. It was formed in 2016 from the previous TER networks TER Alsace, TER Lorraine and TER Champagne-Ardenne, when the respective regions were merged.

History 
On 1st January 2016, the three administrative regions of Alsace, Lorraine and Champagne-Ardenne merged. As a result, on 11 December 2016, TER Grand Est was created out of the three existing systems TER Alsace, TER Lorraine and TER Champagne-Ardenne, including TER 200 and TER Vallée de la Marne.

In spring 2019, TER Grand Est was integrated into the intermodal network Fluo Grand Est. The new branding is used to signify TER train services operated in the region.

Network

The rail and bus network as of February 2021:

Rail

Bus

See also

Réseau Ferré de France
List of SNCF stations in Grand Est

Notes and references

Notes

References

External links
 Official Site (SNCF)

 
TER